The decade of the 1030s in art involved some significant events.

Events

Paintings

Births
 1037: Su Shi – Chinese artist of poetry, prose, calligraphy and painting (died 1101)

Deaths

Art
Years of the 11th century in art